Richard L. Mountjoy (January 13, 1932 – May 18, 2015) was an American Republican politician from Monrovia, California.

Personal life
Mountjoy was born in Los Angeles, California and graduated from Monrovia-Arcadia-Duarte High School in 1950. He joined the US Navy and served oversea during the Korean War. After his navy service he worked briefly as an auto mechanic. Then did  construction work with his brother Gordon, the two later started the Mountjoy Construction Company.  He was married to Earline Winnett until her death in 2009. He has two sons, Michael and Dennis Lee, and one daughter, Judy. Dennis was a member of the California State Assembly, having represented his father's old district from 2000 to 2006. Dick is Life Member of the Veterans of Foreign Wars.

Political career
Mountjoy served as the mayor of Monrovia from 1968 to 1976. He served in the California State Assembly for the 61st, 42nd, and 59th district from 1978 to 1995. From 1982 to 1984 he served as the California Assembly Republican Caucus Chair. While there he introduced California Proposition 187, which denied government services to illegal immigrants. He served in the California State Senate from 1994 to 2000 in California's 29th State Senate district. His political platform fit with that of the conservative wing of the Republican Party: he was anti-abortion, opposed same-sex marriage, and supported both the war in Iraq and possible military intervention in Iran.

On September 22, 2006, the Los Angeles Times reported that a statement in his website's biography, that he served in the Korean War aboard the USS Missouri, was incorrect; ship records later confirmed that he actually served aboard the USS Bremerton. Mountjoy said, "I think it was just something that somebody picked up, it didn’t come from me." However, Feinstein's campaign opined that the error raised enough doubts about Mountjoy’s credibility that Mountjoy was "not qualified to serve the people of California."

Mountjoy was defeated by incumbent U.S. Senator Dianne Feinstein by a wide margin (59-35 percent) in the general election held on November 7, 2006.

He died on May 18, 2015, aged 83.

References

External links
Dick Mountjoy on Joincalifornia.com
OnTheIssues

Mayors of places in California
Republican Party California state senators
Republican Party members of the California State Assembly
1932 births
2015 deaths
People from Monrovia, California
Politicians from Los Angeles
Activists from California
20th-century American politicians
21st-century American politicians